Pierre Julitte (1910–1991) was a French engineer, writer, and member of the resistance during World War II. A prisoner at Buchenwald concentration camp, he recollected his camp experiences in a book titled for the camp's so-called Goethe Oak, L'Arbre de Goethe (1965).

Awards and decorations
France
 Legion of Honour
 Order of Liberation
 Croix de guerre 1939–1945 (France) (5 citations)
 Resistance Medal
 Volunteer combatant's cross
 Order of Agricultural Merit
 1939–1945 Commemorative war medal (France)
Great-Britain
 Order of the British Empire
Luxemburg
 Order of the Oak Crown

References

1910 births
1991 deaths
Buchenwald concentration camp survivors
Commandeurs of the Légion d'honneur
Companions of the Liberation
Members of the Order of the British Empire
Recipients of the Croix de Guerre 1939–1945 (France)